Hueypoxtla or Villa de San Bartolomé Hueypoxtla is a town and municipal seat from Hueypoxtla Municipality in Mexico State, in Mexico. In 2010, this village had a total population of 3,989.

The Hueypoxtla Incident

Federal police and military units established an armed cordon approximately  around the radiation source in the empty lot where it had been abandoned. Six people showing signs of possible radiation exposure from the orphan source were later detained. It is not known whether the thieves wanted the truck (which included a crane), the cobalt-60, or both.

References

 
Populated places in the State of Mexico
Populated places in the Teotlalpan
Radiation accidents and incidents
Nahua settlements
Otomi settlements